Horsfieldia sylvestris is a species of plant in the family Myristicaceae. It is a tree found in the Moluccas and New Guinea.

References

sylvestris
Trees of the Maluku Islands
Trees of New Guinea
Least concern plants
Taxonomy articles created by Polbot